Eudryas grata is a moth known as the beautiful wood nymph. They are known for their mimicry of bird droppings. Found in abundance, predominantly across the entire eastern United States. Hosts for the caterpillar include Ampelopsis, buttonbush, grapes, hops, and Virginia creeper.

Gallery

References

External links 
Photographs of Eudryas grata in their moth and caterpillar forms
Butterflies and Moths of North America
Ohio State University profile

Agaristinae
Moths of North America
Moths described in 1793